Naczelnik ZHP (Chief Scout) is beside the President of the ZHP, the highest function in the Polish Scouting and Guiding Association (ZHP).

Chief scouts of the Polish Scouting and Guiding Association - since 1918

Chief scouts of Boy Scouts 1919-1939
 Stanisław Sedlaczek - 1919-1921,
 Henryk Glass - 1921-1924,
 Adolf Heidrich - 1924-1925,
 Stanisław Sedlaczek - 1925-1931,
 Antoni Olbromski - 1931-1936,
 Tomasz Piskorski - p.o. 1936,
 Zbigniew Trylski - 1937-1939,
 Lechosław Domański - 1939.

Chief scouts of Girl Guides 1919-1939
 Maria Wocalewska - 1919-1923,
 Zofia Wocalewska - 1923,
 Helena Sakowiczówna - 1923-1924,
 Maria Uklejska - 1924-1925,
 Zofia Wilczyńska - 1925-1926,
 Jadwiga Falkowska - 1926-1927,
 Maria Uklejska - 1927-1928,
 Anna Dydyńska-Paszkowska - 1928-1931,
 Jadwiga Wierzbiańska - 1931-1937,
 Maria Krynicka - 1937-1945.

Chief scouts of the Szare Szeregi 1939-1945

 hm. Florian Marciniak - September 27, 1939 - May 6, 1943,
 hm. Stanisław Broniewski - May 12, 1943 - October 3, 1944,
 hm. Leon Marszałek - October 3, 1944 - January 18, 1945.

Chief scouts of the Polish Scouting and Guiding Association (outside of Poland) - since 1945

among others:

Naczelnik of the Boy Scouts
 hm. Eugeniusz Konopacki 1946 - 1947
hm. Ryszard Białous 1947 - 1948
hm. Kazimierz Burmajster 1948 - 1951
hm. Zbigniew Fallenbüchl 1951 - 1952
hm. Wojciech Dłużewski 1952 - 1955
hm. Ryszard Kaczorowski 1955 - 1967
hm. Jerzy Witting 1967 - 1974
hm. Jacek Bernasinski  1974 - 1988
hm. Bogdan Szwagrzak 1988 - 1994
hm. Edward Jaśnikowski 1994 - 2000
hm. Edmund Kasprzyk  2000 - 2006
hm. Andrzej Borowy from 2006 - 2012
hm. Marek Szablewski 2012 - 2019
hm. Franek Pepliński 2019–Present

Naczelnik (Naczelniczka) of the Girl Guides
 hm. Teresa Ciecierska - to 2006
 hm. Ania Gebska 2006 -

Chief scouts of Boy Scouts 1945-1948
 hm. Michał Sajkowski - December 1944 - May 1945,
 hm. Roman Kierzkowski - May 1945 - 1948.

Chief scouts of Girl Guides 1945-1948
 hm. Kazimiera Świętochowska - December 1944 - May 1945,
 hm. Wiktoria Dewitz - May 1945 - 1948.

Chief scouts 1956-1964
 hm. Zofia Zakrzewska 1956-1964.

Chief scouts of the Polish Scouting and Guiding Association - since 1964
 hm. PL Wiktor Kinecki - 1964-1969,
 hm. PL Stanisław Bohdanowicz - 1969-1974,
 hm. PL Jerzy Wojciechowski - 1974-1980,
 hm. PL Andrzej Ornat - 1980-1982,
 hm. PL Ryszard Wosiński - 1982-1989,
 hm. Krzysztof Grzebyk - 1989-1990,
 hm. Ryszard Pacławski - 1990-2000,
 hm. Wiesław Maślanka - 2000-2005,
 hm. Teresa Hernik - 2005-2007,
 hm. Małgorzata Sinica - 2007-2017,
 hm. Anna Nowosad - since 2017

See also

 Scouting Ireland Chief Scout

Scouting and Guiding in Poland
Chief